The Six Days of Grenoble is a six-day track cycling race held annually in Grenoble, France. Since 2012, the competition is called Four Days of Grenoble.

It takes place in the Palais des Sports in Grenoble since 1971.

Traditionally, the event took place the last week in October, the last edition was held in 2014.

Winners

References

External links
Official site

Cycle races in France
Sport in Grenoble
Six-day races
Defunct cycling races in France
Recurring sporting events established in 1971
1971 establishments in France